II D Extreme is the debut studio album by the group, II D Extreme. The album was released on November 9, 1993 for MCA Records and was produced by D'Extra Wiley and Randy Gill, with eleven of the thirteen songs on the album written mainly by D'Extra Wiley (although co-writers helped on several songs). The album peaked at No. 115 on the Billboard 200 albums chart and No. 22 on the Top R&B Albums chart. Three singles also made it to the Billboard charts, "Cry No More", "Up on the Roof", and "Let Me Love You".

Track listing
"Prelude: Falling in Love" - 1:18 (D'Extra Wiley)
"Let Me Love You" - 5:46 (Wiley, Hami)
"Tell Me" - 4:40 (Wiley, Erik White, Kevin Jackson)
"Outstanding" - 3:17 (Raymond Calhoun)
"Thinkin' Bout Cha'" - 4:40 (Wiley, White, Jackson)
"Up on the Roof" - 4:07 (Gerry Goffin, Carole King)
"Interlude: Thinkin'" - 0:52 (Wiley, White, Jackson, Randy Gill)
"Cry No More" - 4:43 (Wiley, Gill, White, Jackson)
"To Love Someone" - 6:18 (Wiley, Gill, Brian Wayy)
"No Way" - 4:27 (Wiley, Chris "Boogaloo" Harris, Lenny "Camille" Williford)
"I Need Your Lovin'" - 4:18 (Wiley, Bobby Arrington, Jeffrey "Fuzzy" Young, Rochad Holiday, Curtis "Sauce" Wilson)
"Yummy" - 3:59 (Wiley, Gerald Thompson, Ray Wiley)
"Postlude: Finally" - 1:38 (Wiley, Tim Carmon)

References

II D Extreme albums
1993 debut albums
MCA Records albums